Clypeostoma cecileae is a species of sea snail, a marine gastropod mollusk in the family Chilodontidae.

Description
The height of the shell attains 6 mm.

Distribution
This marine species occurs off the Philippines.

References

 Poppe G.T., Tagaro S.P. & Dekker H. (2006) The Seguenziidae, Chilodontidae, Trochidae, Calliostomatidae and Solariellidae of the Philippine Islands. Visaya Supplement 2: 1-228
 Vilvens, C. (2017). New species and new records of Chilodontidae (Gastropoda: Vetigastropoda: Seguenzioidea) from the Pacific Ocean. Novapex, Hors Série. 11: 1-67.

External links
 

cecileae
Gastropods described in 2006